Oenopota dictyophora is a species of sea snail, a marine gastropod mollusc in the family Mangeliidae.

Description
The length of the shell attains 9.1 mm.

Distribution
This species occurs in European waters off the British Isles and in the Bay of Biscay.

References

 Bouchet, P. & A. Warén, 1980, Revision of the North-East Atlantic bathyal and abyssal Turridae. Journal of Molluscan Studies, supplement 8: 1 120

Further reading
 Gofas, S.; Le Renard, J.; Bouchet, P. (2001). Mollusca, in: Costello, M.J. et al. (Ed.) (2001). European register of marine species: a check-list of the marine species in Europe and a bibliography of guides to their identification. Collection Patrimoines Naturels, 50: pp. 180–213

External links
 
  MHNH: Oenopota dictyophora

dictyophora
Gastropods described in 1980